Legal is an album by Brazilian singer-songwriter Gal Costa, released in 1970. The album returns to an accessible style following the experimental previous self-titled album Gal Costa of 1969. Legal is diversely influenced by psychedelic music, blues, and R&B.

The album cover is designed by Brazilian artist Hélio Oiticica.

Track listing

Personnel

 Gal Costa - Vocals
 Chiquinho de Moraes - Arrangement, piano
 Jards Macalé - Arrangement
 Lanny Gordin - Arrangement, guitar
 Hélio Oiticica - Artwork
 Claudio Bertrami - Bass
 Norival Ricardo D'Angelo - Drums
 Manoel Barenbein - Production
 Ary Carvalhaes - Recording engineer
 João Pereira - Recording engineer

Miscellanea
"Legal" means "Nice" (or "cool") and it's an analogy to the singer's name, Gal.

References

Gal Costa albums
1970 albums
Universal Records albums
Portuguese-language albums
PolyGram albums
Albums produced by Gal Costa